"Exit" is the thirty-second single by the Japanese Pop-rock band Porno Graffitti. It was released on March 2, 2011.

Track listing

References

2011 singles
Porno Graffitti songs
Song articles with missing songwriters